Willie Hobbs Moore (May 23, 1934 – March 14, 1994) was an American physicist and engineer. She was the first African American woman to earn a PhD in physics.

Education
Willie Hobbs was born in Atlantic City, New Jersey, on May 23, 1934, to parents Bessie and William Hobbs.

In 1954, she began attending the University of Michigan in Ann Arbor, Michigan as a first-generation college student. There, she earned a bachelor of science in electrical engineering in 1958 and a master of science in electrical engineering in 1961. In 1972, she earned a doctorate in physics from the University of Michigan, making her the first African American woman to receive a PhD in physics from an American university. Her doctoral thesis, A Vibrational Analysis of Secondary Chlorides, was completed under the supervision of spectroscopist Dr. Samuel Krimm.

Career 
While working toward her doctoral degree, Moore held positions at technology firms in Ann Arbor, such as KMS Industries and Datamax Corporation. She also held engineering positions at Bendix Aerospace Systems, Barnes Engineering, and Sensor Dynamics, where she conducted theoretical analysis.

After receiving her doctorate, Moore worked at the University of Michigan as a lecturer and research scientist until 1977, continuing spectroscopic work on proteins. In the five years following her dissertation, she published more than thirty papers with Krimm and collaborators, in a variety of journals, including the Journal of Molecular Spectroscopy, the Journal of Chemical Physics, and the Journal of Applied Physics.

In 1977, Moore was hired by Ford Motor Company as an assembly engineer. Moore expanded Ford's use of Japanese engineering and manufacturing methods in the 1980s. She did this in part by writing a technical paper which communicated the concepts of Japanese engineer Genichi Taguchi as working design methods for practical use.

In January 1991, Ebony magazine named Moore as one of their 100 "Most Promising Black Women in Corporate America".

In Moore's honor, the University of Michigan Women in Science and Engineering office established the Willie Hobbs Moore Awards: the Willie Hobbs Moore Achievement Award for achievements in STEM,  the Sister Mary Ambrosia Fitzgerald Mentoring Award for exemplary mentorship of STEM students, the Claudia Joan Alexander Trailblazer Award for innovation in STEM education, and the Cinda Sue Davis STEM Equity Leadership Award for excellence promoting diversity, equity, and inclusion across a successful career.

Personal life
Moore was a tutor at the Saturday African-American Academy in Ann Arbor, a community program for teaching science and mathematics to students in grades 5–12. She was also a member of The Links, Incorporated.

Moore had two sisters, Alice Doolin and Thelma Gordy. For thirty years, Moore was married to Sidney L. Moore, who taught at the University of Michigan's Neuropsychiatric Institute. They had two children, Dorian Moore, M.D. and Christopher Moore RN. Moore has 3 grandchildren, Sydney Padgett, William Hobbs Moore, and C. Jackson Moore.

Moore died of cancer in her Ann Arbor home on March 14, 1994.

References

1934 births
1994 deaths
20th-century American physicists
20th-century American engineers
University of Michigan College of Engineering alumni
Deaths from cancer in Michigan
African-American engineers
20th-century American women scientists
African-American women scientists
20th-century African-American women
20th-century African-American scientists
Bendix Corporation people